The 1975 Texas Longhorns football team represented the University of Texas at Austin in the 1975 NCAA Division I football season.  The Longhorns finished the regular season with a 9–2 record and defeated #10 Colorado in the 1975 Astro-Bluebonnet Bowl, 38–21.

Schedule

Roster

Game summaries

Utah State

TCU

Colorado (Astro-Bluebonnet Bowl)

1976 NFL Draft
The following players were drafted into professional football following the season.

Awards and honors
Bob Simmons, Tackle, Consensus All-American Marty Akins, Quarterback, 1st Team All-American Football Writers Association of America. Southwest Conference Player of the Year, Southwest Conference Most Valuable Player, Kern Tips Award Winner, Southwest Conference Offensive MVP, Southwest Conference Offensive Player of the Year, The Darrell K. Royal Trophy, The University of Texas Most Valuable Athlete Award.

References

Texas
Texas Longhorns football seasons
Southwest Conference football champion seasons
Bluebonnet Bowl champion seasons
Texas Longhorns football